South Cliffe is a village and civil parish in the East Riding of Yorkshire, England. It bestrides Cliffe Road. The parish includes the village of North Cliffe.

Civil parish 
Although the civil parish is called "South Cliffe" its parish council is called "North & South Cliffe Parish Council". On 1 April 1935 North Cliffe parish was abolished and merged with South Cliffe.

References

External links

Villages in the East Riding of Yorkshire
Civil parishes in the East Riding of Yorkshire